I Am a Mother is a 2012 Iranian drama film directed by Fereydoun Jeyrani.

Cast

External links
 
 I Am a Mother on Soureh Cinema
 I Am a Mother on Cnet News
2010s Persian-language films
Iranian drama films
Films directed by Fereydoun Jeyrani
2012 drama films